Bettie Page: Dark Angel is a 2004 film directed and produced by Cult Epics founder Nico B.

Bettie Page: Dark Angel is a biographical drama based on the career of Bettie Page, a famous American 1950s pin-up and bondage model. Set in New York during 1953–1957, the film recreates six lost fetish/bondage 16mm featurettes she did for Irving Klaw (played by Dukey Flyswatter). Her bondage films and photographs gave her the nickname Dark Angel and also led to a US Senate Committee investigation.

Page is played by fetish model Paige Richards. The film premiered at the San Francisco Independent Film Festival in February 2004.

See also 
Sadism and masochism in fiction

External links
 Official Site of Bettie Page
 Cult Epics

2004 films
American biographical films
BDSM in films
Biographical films about models
Cultural depictions of Bettie Page
2000s English-language films
2000s American films